Barbara Hund (born 10 October 1959 in Darmstadt) is a German-born Swiss chess player who holds the FIDE title of Woman Grandmaster (WGM). She is the daughter of Juliane and Gerhard Hund and the granddaughter of Friedrich Hund and Ingeborg Seynsche.

She won the Women's Swiss Chess Championship in 1993.

She played for the West German women's team which won the bronze medal at the 32nd Chess Olympiad.

She made it to the Interzonal stage in the Women's World Chess Championship in 1981 and 1984.

References

External links 

 
 

1959 births
Living people
German chess players
Swiss chess players
Chess woman grandmasters
Sportspeople from Darmstadt